Xysma is a Finnish rock band that was founded in 1988 in Naantali, a small town near Turku. The band split up in 1998, but reunited in 2006 for a memorial gig, and reunited again in 2011.

History

Formation and early years
In the beginning Xysma played grindcore and death metal. The band played at the Turku underground center Panimo, and created an intense yet short-lived scene. Soon after, the death metal/grindcore influence spread to the Helsinki area, with bands such as Abhorrence (which soon evolved into the melodic death metal band Amorphis).

Xysma's first demo, Swarming of the Maggots, was widely distributed via tape trading and became a cult classic (it was remastered and released in the 2004 Xysma compilation CD). The band’s music was inspired by the early pioneers of the genre like Carcass and Napalm Death. With the following mini-albums, Above the Mind of Morbidity and Fata Morgana, the latter being released in the United States with the famous Seraphic Decay label, Xysma evolved towards less extreme metal.

Yeah and First & Magical
Since Xysma was a part of the rise of Scandinavian death metal, they had close bonds to the scene in Stockholm, Sweden, occasionally travelling to and playing in Stockholm, and visiting their colleagues from Entombed and others. Xysma also recorded their first album, Yeah (1991), in Sweden, in the Sunlight Studios of producer Tomas Skogsberg.

Yeah mixed death metal and Black Sabbath structures in a complex fashion. Their second album, First & Magical (1992), revealed more changes and more musical evolution, featuring something akin to death'n'roll.

Deluxe, Lotto and Girl on the Beach
Xysma's third album, Deluxe (1993), continued to evolve their death'n'roll sound, with the instrumentals becoming more rock-like. The songs were hard-paced, in the vein of Helmet. This was the last album on which Janitor used growled vocals. The next album, Lotto (1996), was a full-blooded rock album with a very retro style; one of the tracks was featured later in Brian De Palma's movie Snake Eyes (1998). The band also released an EP called Singles, containing covers of classics sung in a schlager style.

Xysma's fifth and final album, Girl on the Beach, was more or less a pop rock album, and tension between the members grew. Eventually the band decided to quit, and though they played occasional gigs since, there had been no talk of reunion.

Reunions and upcoming sixth studio album
Guitarist Toni Stranius (9-6-1972 – 7-7-2006), member of both Xysma and Disgrace, died in 2006 after a heart attack, in Ireland, where he lived. A memorial gig in his honour was held on 15 September 2006 in Bar Päiväkoti, Turku. All of Stranius' bands (including Disgrace, Xysma and Finnish rock band Kalsaripaita) played at the occasion, reuniting Xysma just for this special event.

Xysma has been playing live concerts again since 2011. The band plans to release their first studio album in 24 years in 2022.

Line-up

Current members 
Marvellous Sidney Safe - drums (1988-1998, 2006, 2011-present)
Janitor Mustasch - guitar (1988-1989) vocals (1988-1998, 2006, 2011-present)
Olivier Lawny - guitar (1989-1998, 2006, 2011-present)
Dr. Heavenly - bass (1992-1998, 2006, 2011-present)

Former members 
Thee Stranius - guitar (1988-1998)
Vesa Iitti - bass (1989-1992)

Timeline

Discography

Swarming of the Maggots (Demo, 1989)
Above the Mind of Morbidity (Mini LP, 1990)
Fata Morgana (7", 1990)
Yeah (Album, 1991)
First and Magical (Album, 1992)
Deluxe (Album, 1993)
Lotto (Album, 1996)
Singles (EP, 1997)
Girl on the Beach (Album, 1998)
Xysma (2 cd compilation) (Compilation CD, 2004)
Compilation consists of Xysma's demo recording, first two mini-albums, and first two studio albums

References 

Grindcore musical groups
Finnish death metal musical groups
Finnish hard rock musical groups
Musical groups established in 1988
Musical groups disestablished in 1998
Musical groups reestablished in 2006
Musical groups reestablished in 2011